Grant R. Mulder was a major general in the United States Air Force.

Career
Mulder joined the Air Force in 1964. He served in the Vietnam War before being given the command of the 64th Tactical Airlift Squadron. Later he was assigned to the Office of the United States Secretary of the Air Force and served as mobilization assistant to the director for logistics of United States Atlantic Command. His retirement was effective as of June 1, 2001.

Awards he has received include the Meritorious Service Medal with oak leaf cluster, the Air Medal with three oak leaf clusters, the Air Force Commendation Medal, the Outstanding Unit Award, the Armed Forces Expeditionary Medal, the Vietnam Service Medal, and the Vietnam Gallantry Cross.

Education
B.S., Business – University of Wisconsin-Whitewater
M.B.A. with honors – Roosevelt University
Distinguished Graduate – National Defense University

References

1945 births
Living people
United States Air Force generals
Recipients of the Air Medal
Recipients of the Gallantry Cross (Vietnam)
United States Air Force personnel of the Vietnam War
University of Wisconsin–Whitewater alumni
Roosevelt University alumni